The River Sidon is a river mentioned in the Book of Mormon. It is described as being located east of the city of Zarahemla and where several battles fought. 

The river may have been named after the Phoenician port city Sidon in present-day Lebanon.

See also

Proposed Book of Mormon geographical setting
Heartland Model

References

Book of Mormon places
Water and religion